Alaska Measure 2 was a successful 2014 ballot measure in the U.S. state of Alaska, described as "An Act to tax and regulate the production, sale, and use of marijuana". The measure went into effect on 24 February 2015, allowing Alaskans age 21 and older to possess up to an ounce of cannabis and six plants, making Alaska the third state to legalize recreational marijuana, following Colorado and Washington. Oregon and Alaska both voted in legalization on Election Day 2014, but Alaska preceded Oregon in enacting their legislation.

The legal status of cannabis in Alaska had varied greatly over the preceding 40 years. Alaska had previously recognized a right to cannabis with the 1975 Ravin v. State case in the Alaska Supreme Court. The state Legislature then decriminalized marijuana in 1982, but a 1990 ballot initiative also entitled Measure 2 recriminalized cannabis until its provisions were struck down in a 2003 Alaska Appeals court case, Noy v. State.

Campaign

Local KTVA-TV newscaster Charlo Greene garnered national coverage, when on 21 September she publicly quit her job on air, and announced her support for legalization. Greene had been reporting on the Alaska Cannabis Club during the evening's newscast, before abruptly revealing that she was the club's owner:

Now everything you've heard is why I, the actual owner of the Alaska Cannabis Club, will be dedicating all of my energy toward fighting for freedom and fairness, which begins with legalizing marijuana here in Alaska. And as for this job, well, not that I have a choice but, fuck it, I quit.

Opponents and proponents

The Alaska campaign was dominated by one large state group per side: the Campaign to Regulate Marijuana Like Alcohol in Alaska backing the initiative, and Big Marijuana. Big Mistake. Vote No on 2 comprising the main opposition. As of end-August 2014, the Campaign to Regulate had filed $700,000 in contributions with the Alaska Public Offices Commission, while No on 2 had filed $40,487. The Vote No on 2 group criticized the Campaign to Regulate for receiving the majority of its funds through the national Marijuana Policy Project; more than half of Vote No on 2's funding came from the Alaska Native village corporation Chenega Corp. By mid-October, the Campaign to Regulate had spent $827,000, against the Vote No's $69,000.

Results

Source: Alaska Division of Elections

Implementation
Possession and usage by adults was legalized on 24 February 2015. Alaska House Bill 123, the Marijuana Control Board bill which established a five-member Marijuana Control Board that shares staff with the Alcoholic Beverage Control Board, passed the House on 19 April by a vote of 37-1. The first legal marijuana store opened in Valdez in October 2016. Other retail outlets have since opened in most of Alaska's larger cities.

References

External links

 Alaska Marijuana Legalization, Ballot Measure 2 (2014) at Ballotpedia

2014 cannabis law reform
Cannabis ballot measures in the United States
Cannabis law in Alaska
2014 Alaska elections
2014 ballot measures
Alaska ballot measures